The Men's 20 kilometres walk event at the 2011 European Athletics U23 Championships was held in Ostrava, Czech Republic, at Městský stadion on 17 July.

Medalists

Results

Final
17 July 2011 / 8:00

†: Petr Bogatyrev ranked initially 1st (1:24:20), but was disqualified later for infringement of IAAF doping rules.

Intermediate times:
2 km: 8:53 Veli-Matti Partanen 
4 km: 17:25 Veli-Matti Partanen 
6 km: 26:02 Veli-Matti Partanen 
8 km: 34:25 Veli-Matti Partanen 
10 km: 42:54 Veli-Matti Partanen 
12 km: 51:27 Máté Helebrandt 
14 km: 59:57 Máté Helebrandt 
16 km: 1:08:15 Petr Bogatyrev 
18 km: 1:16:18 Petr Bogatyrev

Participation
According to an unofficial count, 15 athletes from 9 countries participated in the event.

References

20 kilometres walk
Racewalking at the European Athletics U23 Championships